Bruce Langley (born 3 April 1992) is a British actor. He is known for playing Technical Boy on American Gods.

Early life
Langley graduated with a First class Masters in Physical Actor Training and Performance in 2014 from the University of Kent.

Career
Langley has received positive critical reception for his portrayal of Technical Boy on American Gods.  The character of Technical Boy has been updated for the social media era from his portrayal in the book.

Filmography

Film

Television

References

External links
 

British male television actors
Living people
1992 births
Alumni of the University of Kent